The river Iardanus or Iardanes denoted two or three small rivers in classical antiquity.

An Iardanus in Elis is referred to in passing in Iliad (Book VII.135), where Nestor remembers Pylians and Arcadians gathered in fight by the rapid river Celadon under the walls of Pheia, and round about the waters of the river Iardanus. Strabo (VII.3.12) notes, in describing the coast of Elis "After Chelonatas comes the long sea-shore of the Pisatans; and then Cape Pheia. And there was also a small town called Pheia: 'beside the walls of Pheia, about the streams of Iardanus,' for there is also a small river near by. According to some, Pheia is the beginning of Pisatis."

In the Odyssey (Book III.293), on the other hand, a River Iardanus lies in northwestern Crete— Nestor again recalls—  where the Cydonians dwell round about the waters of the river Iardanus.

Yet in the 2nd century CE, Pausanias  reports (v.5.9), of a sulfurous-smelling river that descends from the mountain Lapithus in Arcadia, called the Acidas, "I heard from an Ephesian that the Acidas was called Iardanus in ancient times. I repeat his statement, though I have nowhere found evidence in support of it." Cyrus H. Gordon was the first to point out that Jordan in the Hebrew Bible is not a proper name, but, with two exceptions, always appears with a qualifier, and suggested that on an early linguistic level it may relate to the rivers in Crete and in the Greek mainland as the word "river". In the Mandaean cosmological accounts Jordan plays an important part, the "river of living water"; Yardena (Jordan) has been the name of every baptismal water in Mandaeism.

Notes

References
Georg Autenrieth. A Homeric Dictionary for Schools

Ancient Greek geography
Mythological rivers
Locations in the Iliad